Plymell is an unincorporated community in Finney County, Kansas, United States.

History
A post office in Plymell was opened in 1886, closed in 1894, reopened in 1918, and reclosed in 1925.

Education
The community is served by Garden City USD 457 public school district.

References

Further reading

External links
 Finney County maps: Current, Historic, KDOT

Unincorporated communities in Finney County, Kansas
Unincorporated communities in Kansas